Ecnomiohyla valancifer is a species of frog in the family Hylidae.
It is endemic to the slopes of the San Martin Tuxtla volcano, in the Sierra de los Tuxtlas range in southern Veracruz state, Mexico.
Its natural habitats are tropical rainforests. It is threatened by habitat loss.

References

valancifer
Endemic amphibians of Mexico
Endemic fauna of Los Tuxtlas
Amphibians described in 1956
Taxonomy articles created by Polbot